Lily Monica Donaldson (born 27 January 1988) is an English model.

Career

Donaldson was born in London, and educated at the Camden School for Girls, living in Kentish Town with her parents. She has a younger sister named Aurelia. She was scouted by Select Model Management in 2003 at the age of 16 while shopping in Camden, and went on to debut in the Fall/Winter 2004 season walking shows for designers such as Chanel, Louis Vuitton, Moschino, Missoni and Jill Sander.

Donaldson has notably landed big campaigns for major fashion houses such as Burberry, Gucci, Versace. and Gap.

In the May 2007 issue of American Vogue, she was featured on the cover with fellow models Doutzen Kroes, Caroline Trentini, Raquel Zimmermann, Sasha Pivovarova, Agyness Deyn, Coco Rocha, Hilary Rhoda, Chanel Iman, and Jessica Stam as the "World's Next Top Models". Later, in the September 2007 issue of British Vogue, she was named a "Head Girl", a model to watch out for in the upcoming season.

Donaldson has appeared on 28 international covers of Vogue which includes the British, American, Italia, China, Australia, Japan, Turkey, Taiwan, Korea, Portugal, Spain and Russian editions. In 2010, she made her Victoria's Secret Fashion Show debut and also walked in the 2011, 2012, 2013, 2014, 2015, and 2016 shows.

In 2009, Vogue Paris declared her one of the top 30 models of the 2000s. Donaldson was the face of the Monsoon Accessorize campaign for Spring Summer 2011.

During the 2012 Summer Olympics closing ceremony, Donaldson was one of the British models wearing bespoke fashions created by British designers specifically for the event. The other models were Naomi Campbell, Kate Moss, David Gandy, Karen Elson, Jourdan Dunn, Georgia May Jagger and Stella Tennant. She wore a gold ball gown by Vivienne Westwood.

Personal life
She is close friends with models Gemma Ward and Irina Lazareanu, the latter with whom she shot two Mulberry campaigns.

After five years living in New York City, Donaldson moved back to London in late 2010.

Donaldson's great uncle is Fleetwood Mac co-founder Mick Fleetwood.

References

External links 

 
 
 
 

Living people
1987 births
English female models
IMG Models models
People educated at Camden School for Girls
People from the London Borough of Hammersmith and Fulham
Select Model Management models